Highlights in Slow Motion is an acoustic rock album by ex-60 Ft. Dolls front man Richard J. Parfitt. Released in 2002 on Rough Trade Records. The sleeve was designed by Welsh-born musician and artist Jon Langford and embossed with a quote from the poet Roger McGough: "…and Cardiff's a tart with a heart of gold".

The album received favorable reviews in spite of a lukewarm reception. "Reflective new direction for one time Britpop hellraiser…the wistful bedsit realism of "Wish I Was With You", and the loveless companionship explored in "I Took That Woman Home Last Night", point the way for a brave and newly impressive writer". The Daily Mirror wrote: "…his songs contain a dreamy charm and tearful romance. A few more sunbursting riffs (the excellent "What We Talk About") and we can call him a boss. "Parfitt’s thing is croaky, tousle headed soul (Chiltern, Westerberg, Springsteen). The vocals are tremendously frayed and some of the steals are impressive. Whatever, this wooziness has a sure value’  Songs like the raw, nakedly emotionally "Downtown" or the superior Van Morrison-style conversational poetry of "Summergliding" display Parfitt's ability to mix adroit fingerpicking with purely pugilistic strumming."

Track listing
"Downtown"
"Stone Honey"
"Summergliding"
"Highlights in Slow Motion"
"What We Talk About"
"Wish I Was With You"
"Let Love In"
"Morning Star"
"Freckles of Gold"
"I Took That Woman Home Last Night"

Personnel

Performance
Richard J. Parfitt – guitar, vocals, piano, harmonica
Gary Alesbrook – trumpet
Carl Bevan – drums
Richard Glover – bass
Osian Gwynedd – Fender Rhodes
Greg Haver – drums
Richard Jackson – bass, slide guitar
Rachel Mari Kimber – cello
Mat Sibley – saxophone
Emily Travis – violin

Production
Greg Haver
Richard Jackson

References

2002 albums
Rough Trade Records albums
Albums produced by Greg Haver